Belarus competed at the 2013 World Aquatics Championships, held in Barcelona, Spain between 19 July and 4 August 2013.

Diving

Belarus qualified two quota places for the following diving events.

Men

Swimming

Belarusian swimmers earned qualifying standards in the following events (up to a maximum of 2 swimmers in each event at the A-standard entry time, and 1 at the B-standard):

Men

Women

Synchronized swimming

Belarus has qualified ten synchronized swimmers.

References

External links
Barcelona 2013 Official Site
Swimming Federation of Belarus 

Nations at the 2013 World Aquatics Championships
2013 in Belarusian sport
Belarus at the World Aquatics Championships